Mahmood Hasan Gangohi (1907–1996) was an Indian Mufti and Islamic scholar and former Grand Mufti of Darul Uloom Deoband and Mazahir Uloom, Saharanpur. 
He was the most senior disciple of Muhammad Zakariyya al-Kandhlawi.

Among his notable disciples are Abul Qasim Nomani, Rahmatullah Mir Qasmi and Ebrahim Desai.

Early life and career

He was born in Gangoh (India) in July 1907 and studied in Mazahir Uloom, Saharanpur and Darul Uloom Deoband. Later he taught in Saharanpur and in Deoband along with the service of issuing Fatwas (Islamic Verdicts). His Fatwa collection entitled 'Fataawa Mahmoodiyah' comprises 32 volumes and is copious reference book on Hanafi Fiqh Verdicts.

Gangohi was an authorized disciple of Muhammad Zakariyya Kandhlawi.

Gangohi remained Principal of Jami ul Uloom in Kanpur for about 14 years, and served as Head Mufti of Darul Uloom Deoband during the last phase of his life.

Literary works
 The Urdu translation Seerat-e-Sayyidu-l-Bashar of Al-Tabari
 Faharisi-l-Haawee li-Haashiyatu-t-Tahtawee
 Manaazilu-l-'Ilm (The Stages of Acquiring Knowledge)
 Malfoozaat-e-Faqeehu-l-Ummah (2 volumes) (The Statements & Anecdotes of the Jurist of the Ummah)
 Khutabaat/Mawaa'iz-e-Faqeehu-l-Ummah (5 volumes) (The Discourses of the Jurist of the Ummah) (only 2 out of the 5 volumes has been translated as of 2018)
 Fataawaa-e-Mahmoodiyah (32 volumes)
 Boundaries of Differences

Disciples

His disciples included Abul Qasim Nomani, Ebrahim Desai and Rahmatullah Mir Qasmi.

Death
He died in South Africa where he was touring on 2 September 1996, At the invitation of Maulana Ibrahim Pandor and was buried in Elsburg about 4 km away from Hazeldene.

References

1907 births
1996 deaths
Deobandis
Indian Islamists
20th-century Muslim scholars of Islam
Indian muftis
People from Saharanpur district
Darul Uloom Deoband alumni
Mazahir Uloom alumni